The Canadian Establishment is a Canadian documentary television miniseries which aired on CBC Television in 1980.

Premise
The series profiles the lives and work of wealthy Canadians. It is based on Peter C. Newman's book, The Canadian Establishment whose first volume was published in 1975.

Patrick Watson was the series host and narrator.

Production
The $1 million series had one of the highest CBC Television project budgets of its time.

Scheduling
Hour-long episodes were first broadcast on Sundays at 9 p.m. (Eastern) from 21 September to 2 November 1980. The series was repeated in 1981 between May and July.

The series was broadcast in the United States on WNYC-TV from April to May 1985.

Episodes

References

External links
 
 

CBC Television original programming
1980 Canadian television series debuts
1980 Canadian television series endings
1980s Canadian documentary television series